is a Japanese gravure idol and LGBT rights activist. She is represented with Yoshimoto Creative Agency.

Personal life 
Ichinose came out as a lesbian in a 2009 magazine interview. She began a relationship with actress Sugimori Akane in 2012 after meeting her in a gay bar in Shinjuku, Tokyo. The couple held a wedding ceremony in 2014.

Filmography

TV programmes

Films

Released works
 Image DVD

 DVD dramas

Manga

Books

References

External links
 – Yoshimoto Kogyo Official site 
 
  
Tkyo Wrestling Ayaka Ichinose Interview 
NHK Online Nijiiro LGBT Tokusetsu Site (Ichinose's video message can be watched) 

1980 births
Japanese gravure idols
Japanese television personalities
Lesbian entertainers
Living people
Japanese lesbians
Models from Tochigi Prefecture
21st-century Japanese LGBT people